Bulletin or The Bulletin may refer to:

Periodicals (newspapers, magazines, journals) 
 Bulletin (online newspaper), a Swedish online newspaper
 The Bulletin (Australian periodical), an Australian magazine (1880–2008)
 Bulletin Debate, a famous dispute from 1892 to 1893 between Henry Lawson and Banjo Paterson
 The Bulletin (alternative weekly), an alternative weekly published in Montgomery County, Texas, U.S.
 The Bulletin (Bend), a daily newspaper in Bend, Oregon, U.S.
 The Bulletin (Belgian magazine), a weekly English-language magazine published in Brussels, Belgium
 The Bulletin (Philadelphia newspaper), a newspaper in Philadelphia, Pennsylvania, U.S. (2004–2009)
 The Bulletin (Norwich)
 The Bulletin (Pittsburgh), a monthly community newspaper in Pittsburgh, Pennsylvania, U.S.
 London Bulletin, surrealist monthly magazine (1938–1940)
 The Morning Bulletin, a daily newspaper published in Rockhampton, Queensland, Australia since 1861
 Philadelphia Bulletin, a newspaper published in Philadelphia, U.S. (1847–1982)
 San Francisco Evening Bulletin, founded as the Daily Evening Bulletin (1855–1929)
 Many organizations or associations maintain a bulletin for members, including:
 
 
 
 
 Annual Bulletin (disambiguation), the name of several publications
 Commercial Bulletin (disambiguation), the name of several publications

Other uses 
 Bulletin Building, Rockhampton, listed on the Queensland Heritage Register in Australia
 Bulletin Building, Washington, D.C., listed on the National Register of Historic Places in Washington, D.C.
 News bulletin, a broadcast report on news of extreme urgency that interrupts normal programming
 Bulletin (news programme), a British TV programme now known as Tyne and Wear News
 Bulletin (service), an online platform by Facebook

See also 
 Bulletin board (disambiguation)